Route 279 is a 48 km two-lane north-south highway in Quebec, Canada, which starts in Beaumont at the junction of Route 132 and ends in Notre-Dame-Auxiliatrice-de-Buckland at the junction of Route 216. The road goes through the Grande Plée Bleue between Beaumont and Saint-Charles-de-Bellechasse, crosses the Boyer River in St-Charles, and slowly goes up the Appalachian Mountains.

Towns along Route 279
 Beaumont
 Saint-Charles-de-Bellechasse
 Saint-Gervais
 Saint-Lazare-de-Bellechasse
 Saint-Damien-de-Buckland
 Buckland

See also
 List of Quebec provincial highways

References

External links 
 Provincial Route Map (Courtesy of the Quebec Ministry of Transportation) 
 Route 279 on Google Maps

279